Turkey participated in the Eurovision Song Contest 2008 with the song "Deli" written by Kerem Özyeğen, Burak Güven, Kerem Kabadayı and Harun Tekin. The song was performed by Mor ve Ötesi. The entry was selected through an internal selection organised by Turkish broadcaster Türkiye Radyo ve Televizyon Kurumu (TRT).

Before Eurovision

Internal selection 
On 17 December 2007, TRT announced during a press conference that the band Mor ve Ötesi had been internally selected to represent Turkey in Belgrade. The selection of Mor ve Ötesi as the Turkish representative was decided from five shortlisted artists, among them being singer Tarkan. Three songs were submitted by the band to the broadcaster in January 2008 and a nine-member selection committee consisting of Muhsin Mete (TRT deputy general manager), Deniz Çakmakoğlu (TRT deputy head of music), Kürşat Özkök (Ankara Television manager), Ümran Sönmezer (TRT polyphonic music director), Neşet Ruacan (conductor at the TRT Istanbul Light Music and Jazz Orchestra), Kamil Özler (member of the TRT Istanbul Light Music and Jazz Orchestra), Can Sertoğlu (manager of Mor ve Ötesi) and two members of the band Harun Tekin and Kerem Özyeğen selected "Deli" as the song they would perform at the contest.

On 15 February 2008, "Deli" was presented to the public during the TRT 1 evening news bulletin. A press conference later took place at the TRT Tepebaşı Studios in Istanbul, broadcast on TRT 1 as well as online via the broadcaster's official website trt.net.tr. Mor ve Ötesi performed the song both playback and live as well as performing a mini concert during the press conference. The song was written by members of the band Kerem Özyeğen, Burak Güven, Kerem Kabadayı and Harun Tekin.

At Eurovision 
Although Turkey had been granted a spot in the 2008 final because of its fourth-place finish at the Eurovision Song Contest 2007, it had to compete in a semi-final because of new rules put into effect by the European Broadcasting Union (EBU). In previous years, countries that received a top 10 placing were automatically granted a spot in the next year's final without having to compete in a semi-final, but for 2008, the EBU changed the automatic qualification regulations so that all countries except the "Big 4" (France, Germany, Spain, and the United Kingdom) and host country, would have to pass through one of two semi-finals. The EBU split up countries with a friendly voting history into separate semi-finals, to give a better chance for other countries to win. On 28 January 2008, the EBU held a special draw which determined that Turkey would be in the second semi-final, held on 22 May 2008. performed 3rd, following Sweden and preceding the Ukraine. Turkey qualified to the final, placing 7th in the semi-final and scoring 85 points.

In the final they performed 12th following Iceland and preceding Portugal. They finished 7th with 138 points (including a maximum 12 from Azerbaijan).

Commentary on Turkish television was provided by Bülend Özveren and the country's spokesperson was Meltem Ersan Yazgan.

Voting

Points awarded to Turkey

Points awarded by Turkey

References

2008
Countries in the Eurovision Song Contest 2008
Eurovision